Zenga Zenga is an auto-tuned song and viral YouTube video that parodied the Libyan leader Muammar Gaddafi. The song, released on February 22, 2011, quickly became popular among the Libyan opposition active in the 2011 Libyan civil war.

The song was created by Noy Alooshe, an Israeli journalist and musician. The original video has more than 5 million views and the edited "clean" version has surpassed 1 million hits.

Background

On February 22, 2011, Gaddafi gave a televised speech amidst violent social unrest against his government. In the speech (in Arabic), Gaddafi vowed to hunt down protesters "inch by inch, house by house, home by home, alleyway by alleyway [Arabic: زنقة زنقة pronounced in Libyan dialect as Zenga Zenga]."

An Israeli journalist and musician, Noy Alooshe, was watching the speech and saw Gaddafi's strange dress and gesticulations as something out of a trance party. Using the natural beat of Gaddafi's words, Alooshe spent a few hours at his computer and using Auto-Tune technology set the speech to the music of "Hey Baby," a song by American rapper Pitbull featuring another American rap artist, T-Pain. The original video features clips from Gaddafi's speech alongside mirror images of a scantily clad woman dancing.

Alooshe titled the new song "Zenga Zenga," based on Gaddafi's repetition in his speech of the word , Arabic for alleyway in the Libyan dialect. American comedian Conan O'Brien ostensibly first popularized the transformation of  into "zenga zenga" and Alooshe named the clip accordingly. By early Wednesday morning in Israel, Alooshe had uploaded the "electro hip hop remix" to YouTube. By Sunday night, through promotion on Twitter and Facebook, the video had gone viral, receiving nearly 500,000 hits.

Reception
Reactions were largely positive, presumably from members of the Libyan opposition who embraced it for its mockery of Gaddafi. Some also found the video distasteful, not only because it contains a woman provocatively dancing, but also because the creator of the video, Alooshe, is an Israeli Jew. At the request of web users who wanted to be able to share the video with their more conservative parents, Alooshe created another version without the clips of the dancer.

However, Gaddafi and his loyalist supporters apparently co-opted the song for their own purposes. As reported by The Guardian, at a speech given by Gaddafi's daughter, Ayesha Gaddafi, "Zenga Zenga" blared in the background.

The original video has more than 5 million views on YouTube. The edited version without the girl has over 1 million hits.

References

External links
Zenga Zenga song (original)
Zenga Zenga song (no girl edit)
Zenga Zenga Remix | "They Love Me All My People"

First Libyan Civil War
2011 singles
Cultural depictions of Muammar Gaddafi
Novelty songs
Satirical songs
Songs about politicians
Songs about military officers
Songs based on actual events
Songs about Libya
Viral videos
2011 YouTube videos

he:תופעת אינטרנט#זנגה זנגה